Listed below are the 2000 UCI Women's Teams that competed in 2000 women's road cycling events organized by the International Cycling Union (UCI).

Source:

References

2000
UCI